Károly Radóczy (30 August 1885 – 18 July 1976) was a Hungarian athlete.  He competed at the 1908 Summer Olympics in London and at the 1912 Summer Olympics in Stockholm.

In 1908 in the 200 metres, Radóczy advanced to the semifinals after a walkover win in the preliminary heats.  In Radóczy's first actual race he clocked in at 22.8 seconds, 0.2 seconds behind Robert Kerr and 0.1 seconds behind William Hamilton. His third-place finish in the heat did not qualify him to advance to the final.

Four years later he was eliminated in the first round of the 800 metres competition.

References

Sources

External links
 

1885 births
1976 deaths
Athletes from Budapest
Athletes (track and field) at the 1908 Summer Olympics
Athletes (track and field) at the 1912 Summer Olympics
Olympic athletes of Hungary
Hungarian male sprinters
Hungarian male middle-distance runners
20th-century Hungarian people